The Ocmulgee shiner (Cyprinella callisema) is a species of fish in the family Cyprinidae. It is endemic to the United States where it occurs in the Altamaha and Ogeechee river drainages in Georgia.

References

Cyprinella
Taxa named by David Starr Jordan
Fish described in 1877